Ady Jean-Gardy (born 15 September 1957) is a Haitian social reformer and international press activist. He became Minister of Communication in Haiti (2012–13) after serving as Chief of Staff of the Haitian Ministry of Foreign Affairs. Jean-Gardy designed reforms for public communication without propaganda, respecting human rights organizations and positioned Haiti as an influential member of the African Union at Addis Ababa (Ethiopia). He worked to end civil wars in Africa and promoted a new image of Haiti as an international leader for peace. Ady Jean-Gardy is also the founder of the Haitian Press Federation, an umbrella organization for various Haitian press associations. He founded the Haitian University of Journalism and Social Communication, also known as the Haitian Center for Teaching Journalists.

He contributed to the modernization and revitalization of the Haitian media world. Jean-Gardy took part in many training missions in West Africa and helped to establish the African Press Federation (Fédération de la Presse Africaine), working alongside various press leaders from Mali, Togo, Benin, Senegal, Ivory Coast, Congo, Madagascar, Morocco, Tunisia and Algeria. The Conference of Ouagadougou in 2004 devoted the wishes of the founder of this grand structure through the unconditional support of the honorable Daniel Whitman of the State Department.

Early life and education
After his elementary school at the Catholic school of the Salésiens Fathers led by the Dutch priest Arthur Bonhenn, Ady Jean-Gardy entered Alexander Pétion High School. He began his career in journalism at the age of 12 years as a caricaturist on the Creole newspaper Bon Nouvel directed by the Belgian priest Jorris Ceuppens. At 14 years old he wrote a novel, Deblozay in Creole who was worth the Price of National Creole Media. He also wrote Poems of my Seventeen Years published by Henri Deschamps Editions, soon after becoming Cultural Affairs Director of the Haitian intellectual magazine Petit Samedi Soir and editor of a libertarian review Inter Jeunes.

After high school, he was granted a scholarship by President Léopold Sédar Senghor of Senegal and studied in the field of  Communications and of Journalism in Dakar, Senegal. On his return to Haiti he was named at 20 years old, manager of Haiti TV (cable television) under the direction of American Edward B. Hatton. He continued studying Communication of Mass Media at the Institute of Washington, and Social Communication at the University of Chicago.

He pursued his higher learning in Haiti at the Institute of Linguistics Applied, studied Architecture at the Civil Engineering Institute of Richard Leconte, and finally obtained a bachelor's degree in economics at the Institute of the Economic Science and Politics in  Haiti. Classified among the first class honors, he won a USAID scholarship to study  at the University of Pittsburgh Economy, Finance and Administrative Management. Returning to Haiti, he followed courses at the Center of Sociology and Psychology by Canadian Prof Yves Bergeron, and of the correspondence courses from the French Institute of Modern History Paris. He also carried out a course on the teaching of modern media studies at the International Training Centre, Cologne, Germany.

He has a PhD in communication, Masters in Economics and Political Science, a master's degree in administration and management, a bachelor's degree in modern history, a diploma in applied linguistics, a diploma in fine arts, and a diploma in sociology and social psychology. He participated in the International Movie Prize, the Berlin's Futura Price in Germany, and he obtained the Caribbean's prize for a documentary film Christmas in Voodoo Colors.

Career
Jean-Gardy, who signs his name as Adyjeangardy on all professional documents, was a civil servant of the UNDP (United Nations Development Programme), an operations manager of the United Nations Programs (1989–1992), associate Programs of the Environment with the Ministry of  Agriculture of Haiti (1992–1993), operations manager at the Office of UNESCO (1993–1994), represented Haiti at the Center for Strategic studies and Diplomacy of Paris (1994–1997), operations manager at the Center for Communication Studies of Deutsche Welle in Germany (1998).

In 1999 he was invited by the American State Department as an international representative of Haiti at the Assembly of Democracy organized by the United Nations in Poland.

At the start of 2000 he fought the Haitian Government on the international scene following several assassinations of Haitian journalists, such as Brignol Lindor in the town of Petit-Goave and Jean Dominique, Director of Haiti Radio-Inter, alerting the International Press Federation, the Committee for the Protection of Journalists, the Inter-American Press Company and the International Court of the Human Rights at The Hague.

In 2003, Jean-Gardy went to Amsterdam to meet members of the International Court of The Hague about the trafficking of Haitian children under the guise of adoption. On this subject he had a series of discussions with Dutch government officials, demanding  better control on international  adoptions to avoid a new black slave trade from Haiti. These steps led to a systematic inspection of adoption records between Haiti, the Dominican Republic, the United States and Europe.

In 2004, Jean-Gardy led several missions to the Governor of Florida Jeb Bush and his officials to convince them to create a plan of assistance to Haiti in the priority fields of public health, education and gifts of equipment for rubbish collection and fire control. In Florida he created a new television network called Haiti World TV (HWT) which broadcasts information programs about Haiti and Haitian history for the education of Haitian communities.

Contracted to the  International Center of Journalists in Washington, D.C. since 2004, consulting during two years with the Africa Section of the American State Department, and Advisor since 2005 of the Office Haiti-Freedoms France, he continues to travel between Europe and America reinforcing the bases of his work within the framework of inter-disciplinary solidarity.

Representative of Haiti to the International Conference of the Inter American Press Association on Strategies to Communicate, his wishes was to see the Haitian State Media (radio and television) become a community media with scrutiny by Parliament and the press organizations in the country. Being president of the International Media Foundation (IMF), by 2006 he produced a number of reports and recommendations for professional development in the media.

Dean of the University Center for the training of  Journalists, in 1985 he was asked by the Military Academy of Haiti to deliver courses on communication techniques, then, at the Police Academy of Haiti in 1995.

Fall of Duvalier
In the fall of the Haitian President Jean Claude Duvalier, the National council of Government of Haiti (CNG) appointed Jean-Gardy director of the Daily newspaper of State Haiti Released (1986), but he resigned 6 months later affirming "not want to guarantee useless massacres of the civil population".  Jean Gardy has entirely reorganized the Association of the Haitian Journalists (AJH) which he directed for 4 years, imposing the presence of this institution in the new Haitian Constitution of 1987.

He was Director General of the Investigation Group Press (1987), and  called by the president Ertha Pascal Trouillot to head the National radio of Haiti (1990–1991) and to help  in the organization of the Presidential Elections which led to the presidential election of Jean Bertrand Aristide. Named by Aristide Ambassador of Haiti in Japan in 1991, Jean-Gardy retracted following the arrest of the President Ertha Pascal Trouillot. He preferred to integrate the system of the United Nations where he was hired by the Representative resident Reinhart Helmcke (Germany), as Coordinator of Programs (Hai89018 project) and Consulting National at the World Health Organization (WHO). Other experiments allowed  Jean-Gardy to be the Representative in Haiti of International Union of the French Press for freedom of expression. He became thereafter Permanent correspondent of Voice of America (USA) in Haiti.

Awards
Ady Jean-Gardy has received several international decorations from Mali, Benin, Togo, Guinea, the Ivory Coast, the Federal Republic of Germany, France, the United States, and Latin America. He received an Award in Florida after inspiring  American authorities to introduce Haitian History in Floridian schools. Following his recommendations, the Mayor of Miami Dade County, former Chief of Police, Carlos Alvarez published an official degree recognizing January as the month of Haiti's Independence.

Author of multiple poetry books, Ady Jean Gardy, eminent Haitian journalist, is also a historian, economist, philanthropist, political reformist and leader of civil rights. Member of the Historical Academy of Haiti, he organized international exhibitions on the history of Haiti and frequently invited at many world events to receive Proclamations and Awards for his works.

References

 Daniel Whitman: A Haiti Chronicle: the Undoing of Latent Democracy 
 Books LLC, Haitian Journalist: Ady Jean Gardy 
 Haiti on brink of becoming latest member of African Union Public Radio International. Retrieved 25 September 2014.
 Minister of Communication Retrieved 25 September 2014.
 Ady Jean Gardy Biography 
 Ady jean Gardy calls for mobilization of the Dominican Media
 Ady Jean Gardy appointed Special Ambassador
 Haitian Journalists: Jean Dominique, Ady Jean-Gardy, Jacques Roumain, Anténor Firmin, Michèle Montas, Jean-Jacob Jeudy, Louis-Joseph Janvier
 Haiti - Politic : Message from Daniel Supplice and Ady Jean Gardy

Haitian activists
Haitian Creole-language writers
Haitian journalists
Living people
1967 births